The following is a list of episodes from the Filipino TV series Komiks, which airs on Saturday evenings on the ABS-CBN network in the Philippines.

The first season of the series presented 12 distinct stories over the course of 13 episodes. One of the stories (Agua Bendita) had two parts.

The second season likewise had 12 distinct stories but had 15 episodes, because three of the stories (Inday sa Balitaw, Bampy, and Si Pardina at mga Duwende) had two parts each.

The third and fourth season of Komiks breaks from the pattern of the first two seasons, with the entire season devoted to a single story, Da Adventures of Pedro Penduko. Matt Evans of PBB Teen Edition stars in the title role. Matt Evans once again occupied the fifth season of Komiks, with a whole new adventure and characters. It is dubbed as Si Pedro Penduko at ang mga Engkantao.

After the much successful airing of "Pedro Penduko" series, Komiks was shelved for a while to give way for 1 vs. 100. In April 2008, Komiks resumed airing for sixth season with the collection of Mars Ravelo's works, with Kapitan Boom as its initial offering. This was followed by Varga, Tiny Tony and Dragonna. Nasaan Ka Maruja? was the only Ravelo's masterpiece air for non-superheroes stories.

Episodes
Mega Manila ratings are published by AGB Philippines in Abante Tonite.

Season 1

Season 2

Seasons 3 and 4: Francisco V. Coching's Da Adventures of Pedro Penduko
The third and fourth seasons of Komiks are devoted to a single story, entitled Francisco V. Coching's Da Adventures of Pedro Penduko, with Matt Evans of PBB Teen Edition fame in the title role.

Pedro is a simple boy who is thrust into the world of superstition and mythical creatures. The oft-taunted klutz of his class embarks on a special voyage accompanied by his special 'helpers', and finds his self-confidence increasing as he passes each challenge in his quest to save his father.

Season 5: Pedro Penduko at ang mga Engkantao
Its ratings started with a 20.2% Mega Manila Ratings beating its rival show with 17%.

Season 6-11: Mars Ravelo's Komiks Presents

Season 6: Mars Ravelo's Komiks Presents: Kapitan Boom

Season 7: Mars Ravelo's Komiks Presents: Varga

Season 8: Mars Ravelo's Komiks Presents: Tiny Tony

Season 9: Mars Ravelo's Komiks Presents: Dragonna

Season 10: Mars Ravelo's Komiks Presents: Flash Bomba

Season 11: Mars Ravelo's Komiks Presents: Nasaan Ka Maruja?

Other episodes

Replay episodes
Inday Bote
Kamay ni Hilda
Piolo at Lorelei

Christian Holy Week: Replayed Episodes
Agua Bendita (Part 1)
Agua Bendita (Part 2)
Sandok ni Boninay

Unaired episodes
Zoila's Super Gee (Judy Ann Santos)
Pablo S. Gomez's Babaeng Pusa (Aubrey Miles and Troy Montero)
Isang Lakas

See also
 Komiks
 List of programs aired by ABS-CBN

References

 Komiks: Da Adventures of Pedro Penduko on ABS-CBN Now

External links

Lists of soap opera episodes
Lists of Philippine drama television series episodes